Philadelphia (also called "Philadelphia magazine" or referred to by the nickname "Phillymag", once called Greater Philadelphia) is a regional monthly magazine published in Philadelphia, Pennsylvania by the Lipson family of Philadelphia and its company, Metrocorp.

History and profile
One of the oldest magazines of its kind, it was first published as a quarterly in 1908 by the Trades League of Philadelphia.  S. Arthur Lipson bought the paper in 1946.

Coverage includes Philadelphia and the surrounding counties of Montgomery, Chester, Delaware, Bucks County, Pennsylvania, and Camden and Burlington counties in New Jersey. During summer, coverage expands to include vacation communities along the Jersey Shore.

The first article published in America that recognized a city's gay community and political scene was about Philadelphia and was called "The Furtive Fraternity" by Gaeton Fonzi and published in the magazine in 1962.

The magazine has been the recipient of the National Magazine Award in various categories in 1970, 1972, 1977, 1982, 1993, and 1994.

Like other city and regional magazines, sections cover dining, entertainment, and special events.  Feature articles cover the range of these topics, along with local and regional politics.  Special (generally annual) features include "The Best of Philly" Awards, with summary top ratings of a panoply of products, services, stores, shops and community features; and "Top Doctors", listing top-rated physicians by specialty; and "50 Best Restaurants." It is a member of the City and Regional Magazine Association (CRMA).

In March 2010 the magazine launched the daily news and opinion site The Philly Post. In December 2010 it acquired the Philadelphia food blog Foobooz, and in 2012 acquired Tim McManus's and Sheil Kapadia's Birds 24/7. The name Philly Post was retired in a September 2013 website redesign, and the site simply published daily news and opinion as Philadelphia magazine.

The cover of the May 2007 issue caused a minor controversy, as it featured a photograph of a nude 31-year-old woman who had undergone the removal of a cancerous growth from her buttocks.

Staff 

Key staff (as of June 2020) includes:

 David H. Lipson, Jr., chairman
 Nick Fischer, chief executive officer
 Eileen Adelsberger, publisher
 Currently Vacant, editor-in-chief
 Kathy Kramitz, chief financial officer

Alumni
Alumni staff includes:
 Karen Abbott
 A. J. Daulerio
 Jason Fagone
 Gaeton Fonzi
 Stephen Fried
 Sasha Issenberg
 Christopher McDougall
 Jessica Pressler
 Stephen Rodrick
 Matthew Teague
 Benjamin Wallace
 Ben Yagoda

References

External links

 

1908 establishments in Pennsylvania
Lifestyle magazines published in the United States
Local interest magazines published in the United States
Monthly magazines published in the United States
Quarterly magazines published in the United States
City guides
Magazines established in 1908
Magazines published in Philadelphia